The Jacob Koons Farm is a historic farmstead at 1151 Otterdale Mill Road in rural Carroll County, Maryland, near Taneytown.  The main farmhouse, a two-story rubble stone construction, was built in 1869.  The property also includes several 19th century outbuildings, including a wood frame summer kitchen, a stone smokehouse, and a wooden barn.

The farm was listed on the National Register of Historic Places in 2011.

See also
National Register of Historic Places listings in Carroll County, Maryland

References

Farms on the National Register of Historic Places in Maryland
Houses in Carroll County, Maryland
Houses completed in 1869
Taneytown, Maryland
1869 establishments in Maryland
National Register of Historic Places in Carroll County, Maryland